NTS may refer to:

Broadcasting
 NTS Radio Online Radio Station, Hackney, Great Britain
 National Traffic System, an organized network of amateur radio operators
 National Television Service, television channel in Papua New Guinea
 Nederlandse Televisie Stichting, now Nederlandse Omroep Stichting (Dutch Television Organization)

Education
 National Technological University (United States), Fort Collins, Colorado
 National Testing Service, an academic testing service in Pakistan
 National Theatre School of Canada
 National Training System (Australia), the Australian system for vocational education and training
 National Treasury School, the French government's school for training civil servants
 Nazarene Theological Seminary, a theological seminary in Kansas City
 The Nelson Thomlinson School in Cumbria, Great Britain
 New Testament Studies, an academic journal

Science
 Nevada Test Site, nuclear testing
 National Topographic System, used by Natural Resources Canada
 Non-topological soliton, in quantum field theory
 Neurotensin, a neuropeptide hormone
 Neurotypical, a term for people not on the autistic or psychotic spectra
 Nucleus tractus solitarii (literally "nucleus of the solitary tract")
 NTS GmbH, Nature Technology Systems, Berlin, Germany

Transportation
 Nashua Transit System, provides public transit services for the city of Nashua, New Hampshire
 Nashville Terminal Subdivision, a railroad line owned by CSX Transportation
 Nepal Transport Service, Nepalese public bus line

Other
 NTS Motorsports, auto racing team, United States
 National Alliance of Russian Solidarists, Narodno-Trudovoy Soyuz, a Russian anti-communist organization
 National Tax Service (South Korea)
 National Theatre of Scotland
 National Transmission System, distributes gas throughout Great Britain
 National Trust for Scotland, a Scottish conservation organization
 Network Time Security, a secure version of NTP
 Null-terminated string, a data type in computer programming